Another Romance of Celluloid is a 1938 short documentary film, narrated by Frank Whitbeck, which goes behind the scenes to look at how film is developed and processed. The film was produced as a follow-up to the studio's Romance of Celluloid (1937).

Synopsis
The film starts with a brief reprise of the previous film, before cutting to the Metro-Goldwyn-Mayer Studios in Culver City, California where assistant cameraman Bill Reilly picks up the film from the lab for Marie Antoinette (1938) which he passes on to cameraman William H. Daniels. Behind the scenes footage shows W.S. Van Dyke directing a scene between Norma Shearer and Robert Morley before the negative is taken to the lab to be developed, dried and polished by lab technician John M. Nickolaus. The test strips are then read and delivered to the print room for printing. A tram takes the viewer on a quick tour of the studio complete with behind the scenes footage of George B. Seitz directing Judge Hardy's Children (1938), Freddie Bartholomew training with elephants for the then unproduced Kim, Luise Rainer doing a costume test for The Toy Wife (1938), and candid footage of Clark Gable, Myrna Loy and Spencer Tracy. The film concludes with a montage from trailers for coming MGM pictures and footage of Louis B. Mayer, Frank Capra, Luise Rainer and Louise Tracy at the 10th Academy Awards banquet.

Production
The film was shot on location at the Metro-Goldwyn-Mayer Studios in Culver City, California.

References

External links
 

Metro-Goldwyn-Mayer short films
Documentary films about Hollywood, Los Angeles
American black-and-white films
American short documentary films
1938 documentary films
1938 films
1930s short documentary films
Films scored by Edward Ward (composer)
1930s English-language films
1930s American films